The Men's 10 km competition of the 2018 European Aquatics Championships was held on 9 August 2018.

Results
The race was started at 12:30.

References

Men's 10 km